Staples is a census-designated place (CDP) in the town of Westport, Fairfield County, Connecticut, United States. It occupies the eastern side of the town and is bordered to the north by Cross Highway, to the west by Compo Road, to the south by U.S. Route 1 (Post Road), and to the east by the town of Fairfield.

Staples was first listed as a CDP prior to the 2020 census.

References 

Census-designated places in Fairfield County, Connecticut
Census-designated places in Connecticut